Zeta Herculis, Latinized from ζ Herculis, is a multiple star system in the constellation Hercules. It has a combined apparent visual magnitude of 2.81, which is readily visible to the naked eye.

The primary member is a subgiant star that is somewhat larger than the Sun and has just begun to evolve away from the main sequence as the supply of hydrogen at its core becomes exhausted. It is orbited by a smaller companion star at a mean angular separation of 1.5 arcseconds, which corresponds to a physical separation of about 15 Astronomical Units. This distance is large enough so that the two stars do not have a significant tidal effect on each other. The stars orbit each other over a period of 34.45 years, with a semi-major axis of 1.33" and an eccentricity of 0.46.

Component A has a stellar classification of F9 IV. It has about 2.6 times the radius of the Sun and 1.45 times the Sun's mass. This star is radiating more than six times the luminosity of the Sun at an effective temperature of 5,820 K. The secondary component (Component B) is about the same size and mass as the Sun, with an effective temperature of 5,300 K. Both stars are rotating slowly. There may be a faint third member of this system, although little is known about it.

The dual nature of this system was reported by F. G. W. Struve in 1826. The pair orbit each other with a period of 34.45 years and an eccentricity of 0.46. The magnitude difference between the A-B pair is 1.52 ± 0.04 magnitudes (at 700 nm). Two astrometric studies have failed to detect a third component to the A-B binary.

This system forms part of the Zeta Herculis moving group of stars. This group includes: φ2 Pavonis, ζ Reticuli, 1 Hydrae, Gl 456, Gl 678, and Gl 9079.

References

External links
 
 
 

F-type subgiants
G-type main-sequence stars
Herculis, Zeta
Binary stars
Zeta Herculis Moving Group

Hercules (constellation)
Herculis, Zeta
Durchmusterung objects
Herculis, 040
0635
150680
081693
6212